Marin Čilić was the defending champion, and won in the final over Stanislas Wawrinka, 7–6(7–2), 7–6(7–3).

Seeds

Draw

Finals

Top half

Bottom half

Qualifying

Seeds

Qualifiers

Draw

First qualifier

Second qualifier

Third qualifier

Fourth qualifier

External links 
 Main Draw
 Qualifying Draw

Aircel Chennai Open - Singles
2010 Aircel Chennai Open
Maharashtra Open